The 1970 US Open was a tennis tournament that took place on the outdoor grass courts at the West Side Tennis Club in Forest Hills, Queens, in New York City, United States. The tournament ran from 2 September until 13 September. It was the 90th staging of the US Open, and the fourth Grand Slam tennis event of 1970.

It was the first Grand Slam tournament in which the tiebreak was used to decide the set at a 6-6 score. The 1970 US Open was the first tournament to introduce a final set tie-break in a Grand Slam. It differed from the current tie-break scoring in that it was won by the first player to reach five points with a sudden death at 4-4. A red flag would be put up by the umpire’s seat to draw fan attention to the tiebreaker in progress. Most players disapproved of the tiebreaker but the visitors loved it.

Finals

Men's singles

 Ken Rosewall defeated  Tony Roche, 2–6, 6–4, 7–6(5–2), 6–3  
• It was Rosewall's 6th career Grand Slam singles title, his 2nd during the Open Era and his 2nd and last at the US Open.

Women's singles

 Margaret Court defeated  Rosemary Casals, 6–2, 2–6, 6–1 
• It was Court's 20th career Grand Slam singles title, her 7th during the Open Era and her 4th at the US Open.
With this title, Court completed the Grand Slam (winning all 4 major tournaments in one calendar year).

Men's doubles

 Pierre Barthès /  Nikola Pilić defeated  Roy Emerson /  Rod Laver, 6–3, 7–6, 4–6, 7–6
• It was Barthès' 1st and only career Grand Slam doubles title.
• It was Pilić's 1st and only career Grand Slam doubles title.

Women's doubles

 Margaret Court /  Judy Tegart Dalton defeated  Rosemary Casals /  Virginia Wade, 6–3, 6–4 
• It was Court's 10th career Grand Slam doubles title, her 5th during the Open Era and her 3rd at the US Open.
• It was Tegart Dalton's 7th career Grand Slam doubles title, her 4th during the Open Era and her 1st at the US Open.

Mixed doubles

 Margaret Court /  Marty Riessen defeated  Judy Tegart Dalton /  Frew McMillan, 6–4, 6–4

Prize money

References

External links
Official US Open website

 

 
US Open
US Open (tennis) by year
1970 in sports in New York City
1970 in American tennis
US Open